This is a list of commands from the GNU Core Utilities for Unix environments. These commands can be found on Unix operating systems and most Unix-like operating systems.

List

See also
 List of Unix commands
 List of GNOME applications
 List of GNU packages
 List of KDE applications
 List of Unix daemons
 List of web browsers for Unix and Unix-like operating systems
 Unix philosophy
 util-linux

References

External links
 GNU Core Utilities homepage

 Rosetta Stone For *Nix – configurable list of equivalent programs for *nix systems.
 The Unix Acronym List – explains the names of many Unix commands.
 The UNIX System Homepage

Unix programs
System administration